Route 9 is a , two-lane, uncontrolled-access, secondary highway in central Prince Edward Island. Its southern terminus is at Route 19A in Clyde River and its northern terminus is at Route 2 in North Wiltshire.

Route description 

The route begins at its southern terminus and heads north, turns right, and goes over the Clyde River. It then turns left in Bonshaw for a  concurrency with Route 1. Turning right to leave the concurrency, it continues north until it reaches its northern terminus.

References 

009
009